Hagnaby Abbey was an abbey and former priory in Hagnaby, Lincolnshire, England.

It was founded as a house for Premonstratensian canons around 1175, by Agnes, widow of Herbert de Orreby.  The priory was a dependency of Welbeck Abbey and named in honour of Saint Thomas the Martyr.

It achieved its independence and abbey status in 1250, and appears from surviving records to have been well run.

In the Middle Ages, Lincolnshire was one of the most densely populated parts of England. Within the historical county there were no less than nine  Premonstratensian houses. Other than Hagnaby, these were:  Barlings Abbey, Cammeringham Priory,  Newbo Abbey, Newsham Abbey, Orford Priory (women), Stixwould Priory, Tupholme Abbey and  West Ravendale Priory.

Hagby Abbey was suppressed in 1536, its last abbot being Edmund Toft. It is an ancient scheduled monument.

References

External links
Chronicle of Hagnaby Abbey 1154-62
Chronicle of Hagnaby Abbey 1173-84

Monasteries in Lincolnshire